Marshall McNeese was a state legislator in Mississippi.

He was born in Georgia and is documented as having been a carpenter and illiterate. He represented Noxubee County, Mississippi from 1870 to 1871 and from 1874 to 1877.

See also
African-American officeholders during and following the Reconstruction era

References

Year of birth missing
Year of death missing
People from Noxubee County, Mississippi